Nikki is a given name. It is commonly a nickname for Nicholas and its variants Nikolina, Nicole, Nicola; and Nikita, and Veronica. It is also a Punjabi name meaning “little one”. Notable people with the given name include:

Arts and entertainment

Music
 Nikki (singer), Japanese-American singer
 Nikki Hornsby, American singer-songwriter
 Nikki Kerkhof, Dutch singer, and winner of Idols 4
 Nikki McKibbin, American singer in the 2002 debut season of American Idol
 Nikki Sixx, Mötley Crüe bassist
 Nikki Stringfield, guitarist for The Iron Maidens and Before The Mourning
 Nikki Sudden, English singer-songwriter and guitarist
 Nikki Webster, Australian pop star and model
 Nikki Yanofsky, Canadian jazz-pop singer

Television and film
 Nikki Bedi, television and radio presenter
 Nikki Blonsky, American actress known as Tracy Turnblad in the remake of Hairspray
 Nikki Cox, American actress known for roles in  Unhappily Ever After and Las Vegas
 Nikki DeLoach (born 1979), American actress
 Nikki Glaser, comedian
 Nikki Grahame, contestant on Big Brother 7 in the UK
 Nikki Patel, British actress from Coronation Street
 Nikki Reed (born 1988), American actress known as Rosalie Hale in The Twilight Saga
 Nikki Sanderson, British actress known as Candice Stowe in Coronation Street
 Nikki Tamboli (born 1996), Indian film actress
 Nikki Tilroe, Canadian puppeteer known as the Mime Lady on Today's Special
 Nikki Valdez (born 1981), Filipino actress and singer
 Nikki Ziering, American model and actress

Professional wrestling
 Nikki Bella, ring name of American professional wrestler Stephanie Nicole Garcia-Colace
 Nikki Roxx, a ring name of American professional wrestler Nicole Raczynski
Nikki Cross, a ring name of Scottish professional wrestler Nicola Glencross

Adult entertainment
 Nikki Benz, Canadian pornographic actress and film director
 Nikki Tyler, American former pornographic actress

Sports
 Nikki Bishop, Australian equestrian
 Nikki Franke, American fencer and fencing coach
 Nikki Garrett, Australian professional golfer
 Nikki Kidd, Scottish field hockey forward
 Nikki Teasley, basketball player for the Washington Mystics in the Women's National Basketball Association

Other fields
 Nikki Giovanni, American poet and author
 Nikki Haley, governor of South Carolina
 Nikki Craft, American political activist, feminist, artist and writer
 Nikki Hemming, CEO of Sharman Networks and President of LEF Interactive
 Nikki Thomas (activist), Canadian women's rights activist and former prostitute
 Nikki Whitehead, American victim of matricide

Fictional characters
 Nikki (comics), member of the Guardians of the Galaxy
 Nikki Newman, in the CBS soap opera The Young and The Restless
 Nikki Fernandez, on the ABC television drama Lost
 Nikki Maxwell, main character in the Dork Diaries book series
 Nikki Morris, a character in the 2004 video game Need for Speed: Underground 2, voiced by Kelly Brook
 Nikki Wong, on the Canadian animated television series 6teen
 Nikki (Dead or Alive character), from the Dead or Alive video game series
 Nikki, the Cardcaptors name for the Cardcaptor Sakura character Naoko Yanagisawa, voiced by Kelly Sheridan in the English dub
 Nikki, on the webseries The Strangerhood
 Nikki, subject of the song "Darling Nikki" by R&B musician Prince
 Nikki Darling, a character on the 1980s animated television series Beverly Hills Teens
 Nikki, from the Diva Starz toy line
 Nikki, in the 2009 sex comedy film Spread, portrayed by Ashton Kutcher
 Nikki, protagonist of Queensryche's album Operation: Mindcrime
 Nikki, one of two protagonists in the video game Pandemonium!
 Nikki Ann-Marie, a dateable character in the dating simulation videogame Huniepop
 Nikki, a character in the 2006 video game Need for Speed: Carbon, voiced by Emmanuelle Vaugier

See also
 Nicci (disambiguation)
 Nicki (disambiguation)
 Nicole (disambiguation)
 Nicolette (disambiguation)
 Niki (given name)
 Nikki (disambiguation)
 Nikky

References